Forte forte forte is a seventh studio album by Italian singer Raffaella Carrà. It came out in 1976 on the label CGD.

Commercial performance 
U.S. Billboard magazine wrote in its 24 December 1977 issue that according to CBS Forte forte forte was among the company's top selling albums over the past month. The single 53.53.456 was certified gold in Canada.

Track listing

References 

1976 albums
Raffaella Carrà albums